Jahrom (also known as Jahrūm) is a city and capital of Jahrom County, Fars Province, Iran.  At the 2016 census, its population was 141,634. Jahrom is the largest city in south of Fars Province and the second one in whole province.

Jahrom is one of the historical cities of Iran. The founder of the city of Jahrom, Artaxerxes I of Persia, the son of Xerxes I, the fifth Achaemenid king. Ferdosi has mentioned Jahrom many times in Shahnameh, especially in the stories related to Ardashir I. There are many ancient monuments and tourist attractions in Jahrom, Such as Sangtarashan cave, Jameh Mosque of Jahrom, Jahrom bazaar, Khan school and fire temple of Jahrom (Qadamgah).

The majority of people in Jahrom are Persians and Shia Muslims.

Jahrom, with several universities, hospitals and medical centers, is one of the academic and medical hubs of southern Iran. Jahrom has two industrial towns, a special economic zone, a dry port, a petrochemical plant, an international airport, an IRIB center, customs and a combined cycle power plant. Jahrom has special governorate and the municipality of the city is the second municipality in Fars province in terms of history of establishment and degree of municipality after Shiraz.

Jahrom's economy is based on agriculture and industry, and its most important agricultural products are dates and citrus. Jahrom produces 1.2% of the world's dates and 6% of its citrus fruits every year. Jahrom International Airport serves the city.

Name
There are three theories about the name Jahrom. Based on Kar-Namag i Ardashir i Pabagan, in which Jahrom is mentioned as "Zarham"; It is probable that Jahrom means "green space". Based on Ahmad Kasravi, the late Iranian historians and philologist, the name Jahrom can be analyzed to render a "warm-place". Jahrom consists of "Ja" and "Hrom", Ja means "place" and "Hrom" in Avestan means "high and forbidden fortress", which is other name of the city of Barzeh (the current Takht-e Soleymān) In Iranian Azerbaijan, near the city of Maragheh.

Nicknames 
"Green umbrella" is a nickname of Jahrom due to the resemblance of the huge masses of palm trees of Jahrom to green umbrellas. "Dar ol-Momenin" is the other nickname which means "house of faithful people" because of high percentage of Islam believers in the city.

Jahrom is also known as the "City of Sour Gold" due to production of lime and the "Land of Palms and Oranges", which are the two well-known plant species of the city and surrounding areas.

History

Jahrom's history goes back some 2500 years when the Achaemenids established the Persian Empire. The establishment of the city is attributed to Artaxerxes I of Persia. The Sassanid monument of Qadamgāh is located to the south of the city, experts believe the monument was constructed during the late Sasanian dynastic era (224-651 AD), and it was a Zoroastrian shrine, probably a fire temple. Jahrom is the birthplace of Barbod, who became the main lyricist and musician in the court of the great Sassanid king Khosrau II (Parviz).

Jahrom was conquered by the Muslims in 641 or 644 after a fierce battle. "The Valley of the Martyrs" in west of the city was the site of this battle, which is why it is called so. As it is described in Fars-Nama, Jahrom's taxes were paid to the Crown Prince during the Buyid period. In the late Safavid and early Zand periods, was the start date of planting trees in Jahrom, specially palm trees.

During the Qajar period, the ruler of this city began to build buildings and places for urban affairs, including the construction of the bazaar, as well as numerous caravanserais and the development of the city. In 1887, Mohammad Hassan Mirza Mohandes, introduced Jahrom as the largest and most prosperous city in Persia after Shiraz and Bushehr. Etemad os-Saltanah describes Jahrom in the late Qajar period a larger city than cities like Qom and Kashan. People of Jahrom had an important rule in tobacco protests of 1890 and Persian Constitutional Revolution of early 20th century. Abd al-Husayn Najafi Lari was the Islamic leader of the city in this period.

Jahrom also had an important role in the Islamic revolution of Iran and was one of the 11 cities with martial law in pre-revolution protests. Seyyed Hossein ayatollahi was the Islamic leader of Jahrom in that period. A soldier killed the military governor of Jahrom on the birthday of Mohammad Reza Pahlavi on October 6, 1978. 1,200 people of Jahrom were martyred during Iran–Iraq War.

Geography

Location

Jahrom, the capital of Jahrom County, is located in the south of Fars province.

About four-fifths of the area of Jahrom County is mountainous and the rest is consist of plains. The heights are parts of Zagros Mountains. Qare Aghaj, Shoor and Simakan are among the rivers of Jahrom County.

Climate
The maximum temperature in summer reaches  and the minimum temperature in winter reaches .

Demographics

Population

, Jahrom has a population of 141,634, in 25,946 families. Jahrom is the largest city in the southern half of Fars Province, the second one in whole province and 67th most populated city in Iran.

Race and ethnicity 
The main ethnic group in Jahrom consists of Persians, while  Basseries and Arabs constitute small minorities. They had nomadic life and later sedentism. Due to the geographical characteristics of Jahrom, specially good Rangeland for nomads, Jahrom has long been a residing area for these nomadic peoples.

Language 
People in Jahrom speak Persian language. They have a special accent which is closely related to Middle Persian. The most significant sign of Jahromi accent is dropping the last letter in words ending in vowels.

Here is a Jahromi poem:

Religion 
The majority of city are Shia Muslims, but there is also a small Immigrant Sunni minority in the city. Religion conversion from Zoroastrianism to Islam occurred after Muslims conquer in 641 or 644 AD. Before that era, Zoroastrianism was the dominant religion of Jahrom as the other parts of the Sassanid Iran. Jahrom also had a small Jewish community all of whom migrated to Shiraz and Israel in the past decades. After the establishment of Baháʼí Faith in 1863, a significant Baháʼí community formed in Jahrom, some of whom were killed during anti-Baháʼí rebellions and now all of them have migrated.

Economic

Jahrom's economic is based on agriculture. there are 350,000 palm trees and 5.3 million citrus trees in Jahrom which makes Jahrom an agricultural pole in Iran. Jahrom produces 1.2% of the world's dates and 6% of its citrus fruits every year. Shahani is the most well-known date cultivar of Jahrom. Jahrom is also the biggest Citrus limetta producer of the world.

Jahrom has several factories including flour, dairy, brick, rug, plaster, plastic, jam, lemon juice, macaroni and cake factory. Jahrom is also the citrus sorting hub of Iran. charcoal is also produced in large amounts in Jahrom.

Products 
Dates, especially cultivars like Shahani, Rotab, Qasb and Kharak; and also citruses like lemon, orange, tangerine, citrus limetta, bitter orange, and citron are the most well-known products of Jahrom. orange blossom, lemon juice, and date-based sweets like Ranginak and different halvas are also produced in Jahrom. Giveh, carpet, felt, kilim, cuprous dishes, and wickers are handicrafts of the city. Jahromi Gheimeh is a special Gheimeh cooked in Jahrom.

Infrastructures
Jahrom combined cycle power plant
Jahrom Petrochemistry
Jahrom especial economic zone
Jahrom economic town
Kosar economic town

Education

Colleges and Universities
Jahrom has several academic centers and there is about 20,000 students in its universities. The first higher education center in Jahrom was the Teacher Training University, which was established in 1956. The basic sciences school of Jahrom was established in 1973 and the medical school in 1977. Later in 2011 and 2007 they were promoted to Jahrom University and Jahrom University of Medical Sciences. Islamic Azad University of Jahrom was established in 1988 and Payame-Noor university in 1989.

the higher education centers of Jahrom include:
Jahrom University
Jahrom University of Medical Sciences
Islamic Azad University, Jahrom Branch
Payame-Noor university of Jahrom
Andisheh College
University of Applied Science and Technology, Agriculture College of Jahrom

Health

Jahrom with several hospitals and medical centers is a medical hub in Fars province and Southern Iran. The sterilization center and the Cleanroom of the Southern Iran are located in Jahrom. There is also a Health Technology Development Center in the city.

Hospitals
Peymanieh hospital
Motahhari hospital
Seyyedosh-shohada hospital
Aboutalebi heart hospital
Rahmanian psychiatric hospital

Medical centers
 Khatam ol-Anbia Cancer center
 Javad ol-Aemeh Chemotherapy center
 Honari Infertility Center
 Hakim Salman Infertility Center
 Honari speciality clinic
 Emam Reza speciality clinic
 Dental speciality clinic

Transport and communications

Communication roads
The most important roads in Jahrom are:
Jahrom-Shiraz highway
Jahrom-Lar under construction highway
Jahrom-Fasa road
Jahrom-Qir road
Jahrom-Khavaran-Sarvestan road
Jahrom-Hakan road
Jahrom-Simakan-Meymand road

Airport

Jahrom International Airport, established in 1969, has 4 weekly flights to Tehran Mehrabad International Airport, Mashhad International Airport and Chabahar Konarak Airport.

The flights to Tehran are carried out on Saturdays and Mondays.

Railway
There is an under construction railway project Connecting Shiraz to Bandar abbas which will have a station in Jahrom.

Bus terminal
Shahid Rahmanian is the bus terminal of Jahrom with daily buses to Shiraz, Tehran, Isfahan, Bandar Abbas, Lar, etc.

Notable Jahromis
 Barbad, one of the first musicians in the world
Mohammad-Javad Azari Jahromi, Iranian Minister of Information and Communications Technology
Mohammad Jahromi, former Iranian minister of labour and social affairs
Ali Mohammad Besharati, former Iranian Minister of Interior
Mehdi Shabzendedar Jahromi, Iranian Shia jurist and member of the Guardian Council
Seyyed Hossein ayatollahi, Shiite clergyman and Ruhollah Khomeini's Representative in jahrom.
Abd al-Husayn Lari, clergymen and jurists of South Iran
Lotfollah Dezhkam, Ayatollah, Friday leading prayer of Shiraz and Representative of Guardian of the Islamic Jurist in Fars province
Sayyid Abdul-Nabi Mousavi Fard, Ayatollah, Friday leading prayer of Ahwaz and Representative of Guardian of the Islamic Jurist in Khuzestan province
Mohammad Reza Rezaei Kouchi, Representative of Iranian parliament and head of the civil commission of the parliament
Ali-Mohammad Khademi, former general manager of Iran Air
Ali Torab Jahromi, Iranian poet
Ali Mohammad Haghshenas, Iranian linguist
Mirza Nasir Jahromi, Iranian architect and poet
Jahan, Persian singer
Sadroddin Zahed, Iranian director, actor and translator

Gallery

References

External links

municipality of Jahrom

 
Jahrom County
Populated places in Jahrom County
Cities in Fars Province